Thomas Patrick Carney (June 19, 1941 – July 20, 2019) was a lieutenant general in the United States Army who served as Deputy Chief of Staff G-1 Personnel of The United States Army from 1992 to 1994. Born and raised in Cleveland, he attended St. Ignatius High School and was elected president from the Class of 1959. Carney earned a B.S. degree from the United States Military Academy in 1963 and an M.S. degree in operations research from the Naval Postgraduate School in 1971. He received two Distinguished Service Medals and three awards of the Legion of Merit.

After his death, Carney was interred at Arlington National Cemetery on December 11, 2019.

References

1941 births
2019 deaths
People from Cleveland
Saint Ignatius High School (Cleveland) alumni
United States Military Academy alumni
United States Army personnel of the Vietnam War
Recipients of the Meritorious Service Medal (United States)
Naval Postgraduate School alumni
Recipients of the Legion of Merit
United States Army generals
Recipients of the Distinguished Service Medal (US Army)
People from Naples, Florida
Burials at Arlington National Cemetery